A referendum on the Compact of Free Association was held in the Marshall Islands on 7 September 1983. Voters were asked whether they approved of the Compact of Free Association with the United States, and if not, what status they preferred. The Compact was approved by 58.0% of voters, rendering the outcome of the second question irrelevant.

Results

Free Association with the USA

Status

References

Marshall Islands
1983 in the Marshall Islands
Referendums in the Marshall Islands
Independence referendums